NGC 2359 (also known as Thor's Helmet) is an emission nebula in the constellation Canis Major. The nebula is approximately 3,670 parsecs (11.96 thousand light years) away and 30 light-years in size.  The central star is the Wolf-Rayet star WR7, an extremely hot star thought to be in a brief pre-supernova stage of evolution. It is similar in nature to the Bubble Nebula, but interactions with a nearby large molecular cloud are thought to have contributed to the more complex shape and curved bow-shock structure of Thor's Helmet.

It is also catalogued as Sharpless 2-298 and Gum 4.

The nebula has an overall bubble shape, but with complex filamentary structures.  The nebula contains several hundred solar masses of ionised material, plus several thousand more of unionised gas.  It is largely interstellar material swept up by winds from the central star, although some material does appear to be enriched with the products of fusion and is likely to come directly from the star.  The expansion rate of different portions of the nebula varies from 10 km/s to at least 30 km/s, leading to age estimates of 78,500 - 236,000 years.  The nebula has been studied at radio and x-ray wavelengths, but it is still unclear whether it was produced at the class O main sequence stage of development, as a red supergiant, luminous blue variable, or mainly as a Wolf-Rayet star.

NGC 2361 is a bright knot of nebulosity on one edge of the central ring of NGC 2359.

Gallery

References

External links

 Astronomy Picture of the Day - Search for NGC 2359
 astrosurf.com
 Kopernik image
 
 Encyclopedia article
 ESO celebrates its 50th anniversary
 Thor's Helmet at Constellation Guide

Emission nebulae
Wolf–Rayet nebulae
Canis Major
2359
Sharpless objects
Star-forming regions